The Rubus Arcticus is an annual cultural grant awarded by the County Council of Norrbotten County in Sweden. The grant is named after the Rubus arcticus, the scientific name of the Arctic raspberry, which is the provincial flower of Norrbotten.  

The grant is a development grant worth 100,000 SEK awarded to professional artists. From 1995 until 1998, it was awarded twice a year, once in the spring and once in the fall, to four artists each time. From 1998 until 2001, it was awarded to eight artists once a year. Since 2001, the grant has been awarded to four artists once a year.

Recipients

References

External links 
 Culture in Norrbotten

Awards established in 1995
Norrbotten County
Scholarships in Sweden
Arts awards